Via Lata (Latin - broad road) may mean one of two ancient Roman roads:

The Via Lata (Rome), now known as the Via del Corso, another name for the Via Flaminia once it has entered the city through the Porta del Popolo, in Rome.
The Via Lata (Spain), now known as the Via de la Plata, in Spain

Via Lata (Rome) was the birthplace of Pope Valentine in 800 A.D.